Poisoned Arrows: An investigative journey through the forbidden lands of West Papua is a 1989 book by British writer and environmental and political activist, George Monbiot. Another edition was released in 2003.

Background
The book covers Monbiot's travels in the 'forbidden forest territories of Irian Jaya' and his experiences with indigenous people, who Monbiot claims are being 'systematically exterminated' along with their wild forests.

Reception
The book was widely praised in diverse sources. The Sunday Express described the book as 'stunning...the strength of the book is that he resists the twin temptations of humourless campaigning and macho bragging' whilst the Sunday Telegraph noted 'Monbiot is fascinating about the forest, the birds, the plants and, above all, the people. His descriptions of the various tribes and their beliefs are both erudite and affecting in their warmth'. The book was also commended in the New Scientist and the Sunday Correspondent.

See also 

 Papua conflict

References

1989 non-fiction books
Works about Western New Guinea
Books about Indonesia
Books about indigenous rights
Books by George Monbiot
English-language books